Fabien Galateau (Nanteuil-la-Fosse, 13 July 1913 — Avignon, 23 September 1995) was a French professional road bicycle racer.  His brother Gabriel Galateau was also a cyclist. During the Tours de France of 1938 and 1939, Fabien Galateau won two stages.

Major results

1936
Nice-Toulon-Nice
1937
Circuit del Ventor
1938
Tour de France:
Winner stage 19
Circuit de Cantal
1939
GP de l'Eco d'Alger
Manche-Océan
Tour de France:
Winner stage 1

External links 

Official Tour de France results for Fabien Galateau

French male cyclists
1913 births
1995 deaths
French Tour de France stage winners
Sportspeople from Aisne
Cyclists from Hauts-de-France
20th-century French people